Tomáš Okrouhlický (born 4 November 1985) is a Czech former road cyclist.

Major results

2008
 2nd Tour de Vysočina
2009
 3rd Time trial, National Road Championships
 9th Rogaland GP
2010
 4th Raiffeisen Grand Prix
 5th Time trial, National Road Championships
2011
 3rd Time trial, National Road Championships
 6th Rutland–Melton CiCLE Classic
2012
 2nd Tour de l'Oder
 5th Time trial, National Road Championships
2013
 1st Stage 7 An Post Rás
 3rd Time trial, National Road Championships
 5th Tour Bohemia
2014
 1st Stages 6 & 7 (ITT) Bałtyk–Karkonosze Tour
 4th Time trial, National Road Championships
2015
 2nd Rund um den Sachsenring
 4th Time trial, National Road Championships
 10th Duo Normand
2016
 4th Time trial, National Road Championships
2017
 5th Visegrad 4 Kerekparverseny
 6th Time trial, National Road Championships

References

External links

1985 births
Living people
Czech male cyclists
Sportspeople from Prague